Carex erythrorrhiza is a tussock-forming species of perennial sedge in the family Cyperaceae. It is native to parts of Africa.

The species was first formally described by the botanist Johann Otto Boeckeler in 1875 as a part of the work Linnaea. The type specimen was collected in Ethiopia near Demerki and Debreski by Georg Wilhelm Schimper.

See also
List of Carex species

References

erythrorrhiza
Taxa named by Johann Otto Boeckeler
Plants described in 1875
Flora of Ethiopia
Flora of Tanzania
Flora of Uganda
Flora of Kenya
Flora of the Democratic Republic of the Congo